The 2016–17 VfB Stuttgart season is the 124th season and the first season since being relegated from the Bundesliga during the 2015–16 season. This is the first time in 41 years that Stuttgart were relegated.

Background
Stuttgart were relegated after finishing in 17th place in the Bundesliga. They were sent down after a 3–1 loss to VfL Wolfsburg. This is their first relegation since 1975. Jürgen Kramny was demoted to head coach of the reserve team. He was replaced by Jos Luhukay. They also sacked Robin Dutt, who had been the sporting director.

2. Bundesliga

Review
Stuttgart began the 2016–17 league season with a 2–1 win against FC St. Pauli. Alexandru Maxim and Christian Gentner scored for Stuttgart and Aziz Bouhaddouz scored for St. Pauli. This was their first match in the second division in 39 years.

League table

Results summary

Results by matchday

League fixtures and results

2. Bundesliga

DFB-Pokal

DFB-Pokal review

In the first round draw, Stuttgart were drawn against FC 08 Homburg.

DFB-Pokal fixtures and results

Player information

Transfers

In

Out

References

VfB Stuttgart seasons
Stuttgart